The following is an alphabetical list of articles related to the U.S. state of Kansas.

0–9 

25th meridian west from Washington

A
Abortion in Kansas
Adams-Onís Treaty of 1819
Adjacent states:

Agriculture
corn
Kansas Department of Agriculture
Wheat
Wine in Kansas
airports
Alcohol laws of Kansas
American Civil War
Kansas military units
American West
"Old West" or "Wild West"
Amusement parks in Kansas
Arboreta in Kansas
commons:Category:Arboreta in Kansas
Archaeology of Kansas
:Category:Archaeological sites in Kansas
commons:Category:Archaeological sites in Kansas
Architecture of Kansas
area codes, telephone: 316, 620, 785, 913
Arkansas River
Art museums and galleries in Kansas
commons:Category:Art museums and galleries in Kansas
Astronomy
Astronomical observatories in Kansas
commons:Category:Astronomical observatories in Kansas
Haviland Crater
attorneys general (category)
attractions (category)
aviation

B
Baby Jay
Battle of Baxter Springs
Battle of Marais des Cygnes
Battle of Mine Creek
Big Red One
birds
Bleeding Kansas
(Kansas) Board of Regents
boarding schools (category)
Boeing
Botanical gardens in Kansas
commons:Category:Botanical gardens in Kansas
Boy Scouts of America
Scouting in Kansas
bridges (category)
Brown v. Board of Education of Topeka
Buildings and structures in Kansas
commons:Category:Buildings and structures in Kansas
business
see economy

C

Cannabis in Kansas
Capital of the State of Kansas
Capital punishment
executions by the state
Capitol of the State of Kansas
commons:Category:Kansas State Capitol
First Territorial Capitol of Kansas
Cemeteries
Census
Census-designated places (category)
Census statistical areas
Cherokee Strip
Chisholm Trail
Churches (category)
Cinemas (category)
Cities
County seats
fictional (category)
former (category)
ghost towns (category)
state capital
unincorporated communities (category)
Climate of Kansas
Climate change in Kansas 
colleges
community colleges
Kansas Board of Regents
Combined Statistical Areas (CSAs)
Communications in Kansas
commons:Category:Communications in Kansas
companies based in Kansas (category)
congressional districts
U.S. House of Representatives (District 1, 2, 3, 4, 5, 6, 7, 8)
congressmen
state (category)
United States
corn
counties
commons:Category:Counties in Kansas
county seats
name etymologies
craters
Haviland crater
crime (category)
crops
see agriculture and other individual topics
culture (category)
festivals (category)
museums (category)
restaurants (category)

D
Dodge City Community College
Dodge City
dams
Demographics of Kansas
desegregation
disasters (category)
see also natural disasters
Dust Bowl

E
Economy of Kansas
:Category:Economy of Kansas
commons:Category:Economy of Kansas
companies based in Kansas (category)
locations by per capita income
Education in Kansas
:Category:Education in Kansas
commons:Category:Education in Kansas
boarding schools (category)
colleges and universities
elementary schools (category)
high schools
Kansas Board of Regents
law schools (category)
middle schools (category)
preparatory schools (category)
unified school districts (USD)
Eisenhower, President Dwight D.
biography
Eisenhower Presidential Center
Elections in the state of Kansas
commons:Category:Kansas elections
elementary schools (category)
energy
facilities (category)
Hugoton Natural Gas Area
wind power
Environment of Kansas
commons:Category:Environment of Kansas
etymologies
county names
evolution hearings
executions
Exodusters

F

Farming
Festivals in Kansas
Kansas State Fair
commons:Category:Festivals in Kansas
Fiction
Fictional characters from Kansas (category)
Films set in Kansas
Television shows set in Kansas (category)
Flag of the state of Kansas
Flora of Kansas (category)
Forts in Kansas
:Category:Forts in Kansas
commons:Category:Forts in Kansas

G

gardens, botanical (category)
Geography of Kansas
:Category:Geography of Kansas
commons:Category:Geography of Kansas
Geology of Kansas
:Category:Geology of Kansas
commons:Category:Geology of Kansas
Ghost towns in Kansas
:Category:Ghost towns in Kansas
commons:Category:Ghost towns in Kansas
Golf clubs and courses in Kansas
Government of the state of Kansas  website
:Category:Government of Kansas
commons:Category:Government of Kansas
government agencies
Kansas Board of Regents
Kansas Department of Agriculture
Kansas Highway Patrol
state agencies (category)
State Library of Kansas
Governor of the State of Kansas
List of governors of Kansas
Great Plains
Great Seal of the State of Kansas

H
Hamilton Quarry
Haviland crater
Heritage railroads in Kansas
commons:Category:Heritage railroads in Kansas
High Plains
high schools
Highway routes in Kansas
Interstate (category)
Kansas Highway Patrol
state
U.S. (category)
Highway Patrol of Kansas
Hiking trails in Kansas
commons:Category:Hiking trails in Kansas
historic places
forts (category)
registered places
historical figures
History of Kansas
Historical outline of Kansas
:Category:History of Kansas
commons:Category:History of Kansas
hospitals
hotels (category)

I
Images of Kansas
commons:Category:Kansas
Interstate highways (category)
Islands in Kansas

J
judges
state supreme court justices (category)

K
Kansas  website
:Category:Kansas
commons:Category:Kansas
commons:Category:Maps of Kansas
Kansas Board of Regents
Kansas City Track Association
Kansas Department of Agriculture
Kansas Forts and Posts
Kansas Highway Patrol
Kansas–Nebraska Act
Kansas one room school
Kansas River
Kansas Speedway
Kansas State Capitol
Kansas State Fair
Kansas Supreme Court
Kansas Territory
Kansas Turnpike
Kansas University Rangers
Kansas Women Attorneys Association
Kaw
KS – United States Postal Service postal code for the State of Kansas

L
Lakes, reservoirs, and dams in Kansas
:Category:Lakes of Kansas
commons:Category:Lakes of Kansas
landforms (category)
Landmarks in Kansas
:Category:Landmarks in Kansas
commons:Category:Landmarks in Kansas
law
alcohol laws
Brown v. Board of Education of Topeka
crime (category)
desegregation
executions by the state
Kansas–Nebraska Act
law schools (category)
lawyers (category)
state laws (category)
law enforcement
Kansas Attorneys General (category)
Kansas Highway Patrol
state prisons
Lecompton, Kansas Territory, disputed territorial capital 1856-1861
Lecompton Constitution
LGBT rights in Kansas
Lists related to the State of Kansas:
List of airports in Kansas
List of census statistical areas in Kansas
List of cities in Kansas
List of colleges and universities in Kansas
List of companies in Kansas
List of counties in Kansas
List of dams and reservoirs in Kansas
List of forts in Kansas
List of ghost towns in Kansas
List of governors of Kansas
List of high schools in Kansas
List of highway routes in Kansas
List of hospitals in Kansas
List of individuals executed in Kansas
List of islands in Kansas
List of lakes in Kansas
List of law enforcement agencies in Kansas
List of museums in Kansas
List of National Historic Landmarks in Kansas
List of newspapers in Kansas
List of people from Kansas
List of places in Kansas
List of power stations in Kansas
List of radio stations in Kansas
List of railroads in Kansas
List of Registered Historic Places in Kansas
List of rivers of Kansas
List of school districts in Kansas
List of state parks in Kansas
List of state prisons in Kansas
List of symbols of the State of Kansas
List of television stations in Kansas
List of United States congressional delegations from Kansas
List of United States congressional districts in Kansas
List of United States representatives from Kansas
List of United States senators from Kansas
literature
writers (category)
Louisiana Purchase of 1803

M
malls (category)
Maps of Kansas
commons:Category:Maps of Kansas
mass media (category)
mayors (category)
meadowlark
metropolitan areas
Kansas City Metropolitan Area
Metropolitan Statistical Areas (MSAs)
middle schools (category)
Midwestern United States
military
Big Red One
Civil War units
facilities (category)
forts (category)
Missouri River
Monuments and memorials in Kansas
commons:Category:Monuments and memorials in Kansas
Mount Sunflower
movie theatres (category)
municipal universities
Museums in Kansas
:Category:Museums in Kansas
commons:Category:Museums in Kansas
Music of Kansas
commons:Category:Music of Kansas
:Category:Musical groups from Kansas
:Category:Musicians from Kansas
:Category:Music venues in Kansas

N
National Wildlife Refuges (category)
Native American tribes (category)
Natural arches of Kansas
commons:Category:Natural arches of Kansas
natural disasters (category)
tornadoes (category)
Natural gas pipelines in Kansas
Natural history of Kansas
commons:Category:Natural history of Kansas
naval ships
USS Kansas
USS Topeka
newspapers

O
observatories, astronomical (category)
Office of the Kansas Securities Commissioner
Old West
Oregon Trail
Outdoor sculptures in Kansas
commons:Category:Outdoor sculptures in Kansas
Ozarks

P
parks
amusement (category)
state parks
zoological (category)
Pawnee, Kansas Territory, first territorial capital 1855
People from Kansas
List of lists of people from Kansas
:Category:People from Kansas
commons:Category:People from Kansas
:Category:People by city in Kansas
:Category:People by county in Kansas
:Category:People from Kansas by occupation
Places in Kansas
politicians (category)
Politics of Kansas
commons:Category:Politics of Kansas
preparatory schools (category)
President Dwight D. Eisenhower
biography
Eisenhower Presidential Center
prisons, state
Protected areas of Kansas
commons:Category:Protected areas of Kansas

Q

R
radio stations
Railroad museums in Kansas
commons:Category:Railroad museums in Kansas
railroads
recreational areas (category)
regions (category)
Registered Historic Places
Religion in Kansas
commons:Category:Religion in Kansas
cemeteries (category)
churches (category)
Republican Party of Kansas
reservoirs
restaurants (category)
Right Between the Ears
rivers
Rock formations in Kansas
commons:Category:Rock formations in Kansas

S
Same-sex marriage in Kansas
Santa Fe Trail
Santa Fe Trail Remains
schools
see education
Scouting in Kansas
seal
senators
State (category)
United States
Settlements in Kansas
Cities in Kansas
Townships in Kansas
Census Designated Places in Kansas
Other unincorporated communities in Kansas
List of ghost towns in Kansas
Shawnee Mission, Kansas Territory, territorial capital 1855-1856
Ships of the U.S. Navy, USS Kansas
Shopping malls (category)
Snakes (category)
Solar power in Kansas
Sports in Kansas
commons:Category:Sports in Kansas
Sports venues in Kansas
commons:Category:Sports venues in Kansas
state highways
State of Kansas  website
Government of the State of Kansas
:Category:Government of Kansas
commons:Category:Government of Kansas
state parks
state prisons
state supreme court justices (category)
state universities
Structures in Kansas
commons:Category:Buildings and structures in Kansas
Sunflower
Symbols of the State of Kansas website
Kansas state amphibian:  barred tiger salamander (Ambystoma mavortium)
Kansas state bird:  western meadowlark (Sturnella neglecta)
Kansas state fish:  channel catfish (Ictalurus punctatus)
Kansas state flag:  Flag of the State of Kansas
Kansas state flower:  wild sunflower (Helianthus annuus)
Kansas state insect:  western honey bee (Apis mellifera mellifera)
Kansas state mammal:  American bison (Bison bison)
Kansas state motto:  Ad astra per aspera  (Latin for To the stars through difficulties)
Kansas state nickname:  Sunflower State
Kansas state reptile:  ornate box turtle (Terrapene ornata ornata)
Kansas state seal:  Great Seal of the State of Kansas
Kansas state soil:  Harney silt loam website (unofficial)
Kansas state song:  "Home on the Range"
Kansas state tree:  plains cottonwood (Populus sargentii)
United States quarter dollar - Kansas 2005

T
Telecommunications in Kansas
commons:Category:Communications in Kansas
Telephone area codes in Kansas
316, 620, 785, 913
television
personalities (category)
stations
television shows set in Kansas (category)
Territory of Kansas, 1854–1861
Territory of Louisiana, 1805–1812
Territory of Missouri, 1812–1821
Theatres in Kansas
commons:Category:Theatres in Kansas
:Category:Cinemas and movie theaters in Kansas
Topeka, Kansas, territorial and state capital since 1856
tornadoes (category)
Tourism in Kansas  website
commons:Category:Tourism in Kansas
townships (category)
trails, hiking (category)
Transportation in Kansas
:Category:Transportation in Kansas
commons:Category:Transport in Kansas
Treaty of Guadalupe Hidalgo of 1848
25th meridian west from Washington

U
Unified school districts (USD)
Unincorporated communities (category)
Census-designated places (category)
Ghost towns (category)
United States of America
States of the United States of America
United States census statistical areas of Kansas
United States congressional delegations from Kansas
United States congressional districts in Kansas
United States Court of Appeals for the Tenth Circuit
United States District Court for the District of Kansas
United States representatives from Kansas
United States senators from Kansas
Universities
U.S. Highways (category)
U.S. military facilities (category)
U.S. Route 66
US-KS – ISO 3166-2:US region code for the State of Kansas 
USS Kansas 
USS Topeka

V

W
water companies
Water parks in Kansas
wheat
Wikimedia
Wikimedia Commons:Category:Kansas
commons:Category:Maps of Kansas
Wikinews:Category:Kansas
Wikinews:Portal:Kansas
Wikipedia Category:Kansas
Wikipedia Portal:Kansas
Wikipedia:WikiProject Kansas
:Category:WikiProject Kansas articles
:Category:WikiProject Kansas members
wildlife
birds
cougar
coyote
hunting
meadowlark
National Wildlife Refuges (category)
pronghorn
snakes
white-tailed deer
zoos (category)
Wild West
Wind power in Kansas
Wine in Kansas
Wolf Creek Nuclear Generating Station
writers (category)

X

Y
youth
Scouting

Z
Zoos in Kansas
commons:Category:Zoos in Kansas

See also

Topic overview:
Kansas
Outline of Kansas

Kansas
 
Kansas